Larry Fanning (1922 – 28 August 2008) was an Irish hurler who played as a full-back for the Waterford senior team.

Born in Waterford, Fanning first played competitive hurling during his schooling at Mount Sion CBS. He arrived on the inter-county scene at a time when Waterford's senior hurling fortunes were about to change. During his career he won a one All-Ireland medal as a non-playing substitute and one Munster medal on the field of play.

At club level Fanning was a nine-time championship medallist with Mount Sion. He also won three championship medals in Gaelic football.

His retirement came following Waterford's defeat by Tipperary in the 1954 championship.

Fanning's brother, Pat, served as president of the Gaelic Athletic Association.

Honours

Team

Mount Sion
Waterford Senior Hurling Championship (9): 1943, 1945, 1948, 1949, 1951, 1953, 1954, 1955, 1956 (c)
Waterford Senior Football Championship (3): 1953, 1955, 1956

Waterford
All-Ireland Senior Hurling Championship (1): 1948 (sub)
Munster Senior Hurling Championship (1): 1948

References

1922 births
2008 deaths
Mount Sion hurlers
Waterford inter-county hurlers